Wizard is commonly used in MUDs, particularly LPMuds, AberMUDs and MU*, as a term for the MUD's developers and administrators.  The usage originates with Richard Bartle's original MUD1 and MUD2.  It is frequently abbreviated "wiz", which is sometimes used as a verb; to wiz is to become a wizard.  The plural of "wiz" is "wizzes".

A wizard's duties may involve various combinations of software development, content generation, gamemastering, community management, and other administrative tasks.  Modifications such as apprentice wizard, elder wizard ("elder") and archwizard ("arch") indicate junior or senior staff members.  Other commonly used terms with the same or related meanings are coder, developer ("dev"), administrator ("admin"), immortal ("imm", "immort"), God, and implementer ("imp"); the last two most often refer to the system's owner.  The term "builder" may be used to indicate a wizard, usually junior in standing, dedicated to content development.

A common convention, especially on early MUDs, has been that players have the opportunity to become wizards after advancing to a certain level within the game.  This practice sometimes presents "wizhood" as another level of game, with wizards competing to develop popular content.  As this is, at best, a questionable approach to staffing and development, its popularity has faded with the MUDs of later years.

A "wizard" in a MUD is not necessarily a staff member; it may be used simply in its ordinary fantasy-genre meaning, referring to in-world magicians.  (Being able to employ this usage is sometimes one of the reasons a MUD chooses to use setting-neutral terms like "administrator" and "developer" for staff.)

References

External links
Confessions of an Arch-Wizard, an article by Michael Lawrie about the wizard hierarchy on MIST

MUD terminology